Luigi Ossoinach, last name also spelled Ossoinak (born 24 February 1899 in Fiume, Austria-Hungary, now Rijeka, Croatia; died 4 May 1990) was an Italian professional footballer who played as a striker.

He played 8 games, scoring 3 goals during the 1929–30 season in the Serie A for A.S. Roma.

1899 births
1990 deaths
Italian footballers
Serie A players
U.S. Fiumana players
HNK Rijeka players
A.C. Prato players
A.S. Roma players
Cagliari Calcio players
Association football forwards